Haigler can refer to:

People
 Christina Haigler, American figure skater
 Ron Haigler, American basketball player

Places
 Haigler, Nebraska
 Haigler Creek, a creek in Arizona